Gvantsa Buniatishvili (born 7 May 1986) is a Georgian pianist. She is the older sister of the concert pianist Khatia Buniatishvili.

She plays in duo with her sister in multiple concerts.

References

1986 births
Living people
Classical pianists from Georgia (country)
Women pianists from Georgia (country)
Women classical pianists
20th-century classical pianists
20th-century musicians from Georgia (country)
21st-century classical pianists
21st-century musicians from Georgia (country)
20th-century women pianists
21st-century women pianists